Simonetta Stefanelli (born 30 November 1954) is an Italian entrepreneur, fashion designer and retired actress. Internationally, she is best known for her performance as Apollonia Vitelli-Corleone in the 1972 film The Godfather, directed by Francis Ford Coppola. Her other roles include appearances in Moses the Lawgiver, Scandal in the Family and Three Brothers. In 1992, Stefanelli made her last film appearance in the drama Le amiche del cuore (Close Friends) directed by her then husband Michele Placido.

Personal life 
Stefanelli was married to the actor/director Michele Placido, with whom she appeared in a number of films, including the 1975 erotic drama Peccati in famiglia. They had three children together, including actress Violante Placido, and they divorced in 1994. Following their divorce, Stefanelli and her children briefly lived in London.

A hoax stating that Stefanelli had died appeared on the Internet in 2006, and then again in 2008.

Career

Film and television 
Before appearing in The Godfather in 1972, Stefanelli had small supporting roles in several Italian films directed by renowned Italian directors: La moglie giapponese (The Japanese Wife) by Gian Luigi Polidoro, Non commettere atti impuri (Do Not Commit Adultery) by Giulio Petroni, Homo Eroticus by Marco Vicario, and In nome del popolo italiano (In the Name of the Italian People) by Dino Risi. In 1972, she appeared in the German television film Die Sonne angreifen (To Attack the Sun) by Peter Lilienthal.

The same year, Stefanelli landed her breakout role as the innocent Apollonia Vitelli-Corleone, the beautiful but doomed first wife of Michael Corleone (Al Pacino) in the American crime film The Godfather, directed by Francis Ford Coppola. She was shown topless, although only 16 when the production began and 17 when the film came out. Her character was featured in the 1977 miniseries The Godfather: A Novel for Television.

In 1973, she posed nude in the Italian edition of Playboy, but later refused a career in Hollywood, in order to avoid being typecast and required to do nudity. She explained during an interview in 1997 about the offers of Hollywood filmmakers: "They wanted nothing more than to expose my body... I refused so much work." She continued her career in Italy. In 1973, she filmed one picture in Spanish, El mejor alcalde, el rey (The Best Mayor, the King), directed by Rafael Gil. The following year, Stefanelli appeared in the miniseries Moses the Lawgiver, starring Burt Lancaster, Anthony Quayle and Ingrid Thulin. She would later have roles in numerous Italian films, including Peccati in famiglia (Scandal in the Family), an erotic drama she starred opposite her husband Michele Placido. Eriprando Visconti, Walerian Borowczyk, Franco Castellano, Giuseppe Moccia and Mario Caiano are some of the directors she worked with.

Stefanelli took a break from acting in the mid-1970s following her marriage and the birth of her daughter, Violante Placido, in 1976. She returned in the early 1980s to appear in Francesco Rosi's Tre fratelli (Three Brothers). After appearing in Michele Placido's film Le amiche del cuore (Close Friends), Stefanelli ended her acting career in 1992, just one year before her daughter began her own acting career.

After a hoax about her death surfaced online in 2007, Stefanelli stated that if a film project came along, she might take it. "But after my death, I don't know," she joked.

Entrepreneurship 
Having quit her acting career in 1992, Stefanelli now owns and operates a fashion store in Rome called Simo Bloom, where she designs purses and shoes.

Filmography

References

External links 
 

1954 births
20th-century Italian businesswomen
20th-century Italian businesspeople
Fashion designers from Rome
Italian fashion designers
Italian women fashion designers
Italian film actresses
Italian television actresses
Living people
Actresses from Rome
21st-century Italian businesswomen
21st-century Italian businesspeople